Donald Joseph Savoie  (born 1947) is a Canadian public administration and regional economic development scholar. He serves as a professor at l'Université de Moncton. In 2015, he was awarded the Killam Prize for his contribution to the field of social sciences.

Biography
Savoie has published many books, journal articles, and essays in edited collections. His publications include Federal–Provincial Collaboration, Breaking the Bargain: Public Servants, Ministers, and Parliament, Governing from the Centre: The Concentration of Power in Canadian Politics, Thatcher, Reagan, Mulroney: In Search of a New Bureaucracy, and What Is Government Good At? A Canadian Answer.

His biography Harrison McCain: Single-Minded Purpose was shortlisted for the National Business Book Award (2014).

He was made an Officer of the Order of Canada in 1993 and promoted to Companion of the Order of Canada in 2022.

Publications
 Federal–Provincial Collaboration, Montreal: McGill-Queen's University Press, 1981
 An overview of the importance of federal–provincial relations on regional development: the restructuring of 1982, Moncton: Canadian Institute for Research on Regional Development, 1984
 Regional Economic Development: Canada’s Search for Solutions, Toronto: University of Toronto Press, 1986, reprinted 1987.
 La lutte pour le développement: le cas du Nord Est, Québec, Les presses de l’Université du Québec, 1988.
 Regional Policy in a Changing World, New York: Plenum Press, 1990.
 The Politics of Public Spending in Canada, Toronto: University of Toronto Press, 1990, reprinted 1990 and 1991.
 The Politics of Language, Kingston: Institute of Intergovernmental Relations, Queen's University, 1991, 23 p.
 Regional Economic Development: Canada's Search for Solutions, Toronto: University of Toronto Press, 1992, 341 p. 
 Globalization and Governance, Ottawa: Canadian Centre for Management Development, 1993, 37 p.
 Thatcher, Reagan, Mulroney: In Search of a New Bureaucracy, Pittsburgh: University of Pittsburgh Press, 1994, reprinted 1994, 1995.
 Rethinking Canada's regional development policy: a view of the Atlantic, Moncton: Canadian Institute for Research on Regional Development, 1997, 67 p. 
 Governing from the Centre: The Concentration of Power in Canadian Politics , Toronto: University of Toronto Press, 1999, reprinted 1999, 2000, 2001, 2004 and 2006.
 Community Economic Development in Atlantic Canada: False Hope or Panacea, Moncton: Canadian Institute for Research on Regional Development, 2000, 131 p.
 Aboriginal Economic Development in New Brunswick , Moncton: Canadian Institute for Research on Regional Development, 2000, 143 p. 
 Pulling Against Gravity: Economic Development in New Brunswick During the McKenna Years, Montreal: McGill-Queen's University Press, 2001
 Breaking the Bargain: Public Servants, Ministers, and Parliament , Toronto: University of Toronto Press, 2003, reprinted 2003, 2004, 336 p.
 Visiting Grandchildren: Economic Development in the Maritimes, Toronto: University of Toronto Press, 2006, reprinted 2006.
 Court Government and the Collapse of Accountability in Canada and the United Kingdom, Toronto: University of Toronto Press, 2008, reprinted 2008.
 I'm From Bouctouche, Me, Montreal: McGill-Queen's University Press, 2009, 316 p.  (A memoir.)
 Power: Where Is It?, Montreal: McGill-Queen's University Press, 2010.
 Whatever Happened to the Music Teacher? How Government Decides How and Why, Montreal, McGill-Queen's University Press, 2013, reprinted 2014, 336 p.
 Harrison McCain: Single-Minded Purpose, Montreal: McGill-Queen's University Press, 2013, 336 p.
 What Is Government Good At?: A Canadian Answer, Montreal: McGill-Queen's University Press, 2015, reprinted 2016, 388 p.
 Looking for Bootstraps: Economic Development in the Maritimes, Halifax: Nimbus Publishing, 2017, 440 p.
 Democracy in Canada: The Disintegration of Our Institutions Montreal: McGill-Queen's University Press, 2019, 504 p.
 Thanks for the Business: K.C. Irving, Arthur Irving and the Story of Irving Oil, Halifax: Nimbus, 2020.

With B. Guy Peters (eds.)
 New Challenges of Governance, Ottawa: Canadian Centre for Management / Presses de l'Université Laval, 1995, 306 p. ( ISBN 2 -7637-7445-8 )
 Managing Incoherence: The dilemma of coordination and accountability, Ottawa: Canadian Centre for Management Development, 1995
 Taking Stock: Assessing Public Sector Reforms, Québec: Presses de l'Université Laval, 1998, 311 p.
 Governance in the Twenty-first Century: Revitalizing the Public Service, Québec: Presses de l'Université Laval, 2001, 328 p.

With Ralph Winter (eds.)
 Les provinces maritimes : un regard sur l'avenir / The Maritime Provinces: looking to the future, Moncton: Canadian Institute for Research on Regional Development, 1994, 288 p (.  )

With Maurice Beaudin
 The Struggle for Development: the case of the North East, Moncton: Presses de l'Université du Québec / Canadian Institute for Research on Regional Development, 1988, 282 p. 
 New Brunswick in 2000, Moncton: Canadian Institute for Research on Regional Development, 1989, 200 p.
 The challenges of the fishing industry in New Brunswick, Moncton: Acadia Publishing, 1992, 282 p.

With André Raynauld 
 Essais sur le développement régional, Montreal: University Press of Montreal, 1986, 242 p.

Prizes and awards
Donald J. Savoie has won numerous prizes and awards, including: inaugural recipient of the Royal Society of Canada’s Yvan Allaire Medal for outstanding contribution in governance (2018), the 2015–2016 Donner Prize and the inaugural recipient of the 2016 Writers’ Federation of New Brunswick Book Award for Non-fiction for What Is Government Good At?, the 2015 Killam Prize in Social Sciences, the Order of New Brunswick (2011), finalist for the SSHRC Gold Medal for Achievement in Research (2003), the Vanier Gold Medal (1999), honoured by the Public Policy Forum at its twelfth annual testimonial awards (1999), made an Officer of the Order of Canada (1993), elected Fellow of the Royal Society of Canada (1992), selected the Université de Moncton's alumnus of the year (1991). Three of his books were short listed for the Donner Prize, The Politics of Public Spending in Canada was the inaugural recipient of the Smiley prize (1992) awarded by the Canadian Political Science Association for the best book in the study of government and politics in Canada and Les défis de l’industrie des pêches au Nouveau-Brunswick was awarded “Le Prix France-Acadie” (1993).

He has been awarded honorary doctorates by the Université Sainte-Anne (1993), Mount Allison (1997), Dalhousie University (2003), Saint Mary’s University (2011), Acadia (2014) and the University of Ottawa (2018). He was also awarded a Doctor of Letters from Oxford University (2000).

References

1947 births
Alumni of the University of Oxford
Fellows of the Royal Society of Canada
Living people
Members of the Order of New Brunswick
Companions of the Order of Canada
People from Kent County, New Brunswick
Public administration scholars
Université de Moncton alumni
Academic staff of the Université de Moncton
University of New Brunswick alumni
Presidents of the Canadian Political Science Association